{{Infobox boxing match
| fight date = June 25, 2005
| Fight Name = Thunder & Lightning
| location = Boardwalk Hall, Atlantic City, New Jersey, U.S.
| image = 
| fighter1 = Arturo Gatti
| nickname1 = Thunder
| record1 = 39–6 (30 KO)
| height1 = 5 ft 7+1/2 in
| weight1 = 140 lb
| style1 = Orthodox
| hometown1 = Montreal, Quebec, Canada
| recognition1 = WBC super lightweight champion2-division world champion
| fighter2 = Floyd Mayweather Jr.
| nickname2 = Pretty Boy
| record2 = 33–0 (22 KO)
| hometown2 = Grand Rapids, Michigan, U.S.
| height2 = 5 ft 8 in
| weight2 = 139 lb
| style2 = Orthodox
| recognition2 = [[The Ring (magazine)|The Ring]] No. 2 ranked pound-for-pound fighter2-division world champion
| titles = WBC super lightweight title
| result = Mayweather Jr. wins via 6th-round RTD
}}

Arturo Gatti vs. Floyd Mayweather Jr., billed as Thunder & Lightning'', was a professional boxing match contested on June 25, 2005 for the WBC super lightweight championship.

Background
The Gatti–Mayweather bout had been in the making for over a year. After a tough trilogy with Mickey Ward, Gatti earned a shot at the vacant WBC super lightweight (AKA light welterweight) championship, winning the title on January 21, 2004 with a unanimous decision victory over Gianluca Branco. Four months later, Mayweather would vacate his WBC and The Ring lightweight title and move up to the light welterweight division. Initially, Mayweather was set to face the undefeated former IBF lightweight champion Paul Spadafora to determine who would be the mandatory challenger to Gatti's title, but the fight was nixed due to Spadafora's legal troubles. Instead, Mayweather was matched up against former WBO light welterweight champion DeMarcus Corley in a WBC "eliminator" bout on May 22, 2004. In his light welterweight debut, Mayweather had Corley down on the canvas no less than seven times (though only two were declared official knockdowns) and cruised to an easy, lopsided unanimous decision that made him the number one contender to Gatti's title. After a successful defense against Leonard Dorin, Gatti announced his intentions to face Mayweather. However, several disagreements hindered the negotiations and the two sides would not reach an agreement until March 2005 for a June 25 fight in New Jersey. Prior to the fight, Mayweather repeatedly bashed Gatti in the press, calling him, among other things, a "C-plus fighter", "club fighter" and a "bum." For the most part, Gatti refused to appear at press conferences with Mayweather, saying "I just don't want to be bothered by his mouth."  Mayweather, however, crashed a Gatti press conference, referring to him as a "paper champion" and lampooning his struggle to make weight by loading food on a plate.

The Fight
In his Pay Per View debut, Mayweather dominated Gatti through six rounds. Late in the first round as Gatti bent forwards, Mayweather leaned on him and the referee instructed, "Stop punching." Mayweather continued to punch and Gatti looked to the referee to complain. With Gatti's attention turned towards the referee, Mayweather landed a left hook that sent Gatti into the ropes and on his knee. Despite the violation of his instruction, the referee counted the knockdown. Things would only go downhill for Gatti as Mayweather continued to overwhelm the champion with his quickness and hand speed, landing combinations at will. After losing all six rounds on the scorecards and having landed only 41 total punches to Mayweather's 168, Gatti's trainer and cornerman Buddy McGirt stopped the fight following the sixth round, giving Mayweather an automatic technical knockout victory.

References

2005 in boxing
2005 in sports in New Jersey
Boxing matches involving Floyd Mayweather Jr.
June 2005 sports events in the United States
Boxing matches at Boardwalk Hall